Abul-Hasan al-Hasan ibn Ali (also known as "Al-Hassan ibn Ziri"; 1109–1171) was the last ruler of the Zirid dynasty in Ifriqiya (1121–1152). He succeeded Ali ibn Yahya.

Under his reign, piracy became an important source of income, although this destabilised relationships with Christian maritime interests. In order to secure trade in the Mediterranean he was forced to accept dependence on the Norman-controlled Sicily. 

Between 1146 and 1148 the Zirid realm collapsed, and Abul-Hasan lost all of his realm except for Algiers, until it in turn fell  to the Almohad Caliphate.

Abdul-Hasan lived in Marrakesh until his death, securing some power of governance over al-Mahdiya.

References

Sources
 
Giosuè Musca, Il mezzogiorno normanno-svevo e le crociate, Centro di studi normanno-svevi, Università di Bari (p. 106)

1109 births
1171 deaths
Zirid emirs of Ifriqiya
People from Marrakesh
12th-century Berber people
12th-century rulers in Africa
12th-century people of Ifriqiya